The 2008 Oklahoma State Cowboys football team represented Oklahoma State University during the 2008 NCAA Division I FBS football season.

Schedule

Source:

Roster

Game summaries

Washington State

Houston

Missouri State

Troy

Texas A&M

Missouri

Baylor

Texas

Iowa State

Texas Tech

Colorado

Oklahoma

2008 Holiday Bowl

Rankings

Statistics

Team

Scores by quarter

Offense

Rushing

Passing

Receiving

Defense

Special teams

Awards
Matt Fodge won the 2008 Ray Guy Award
First Team All-American: Kendall Hunter, Dez Bryant(consensus), Perrish Cox
All-Big 12: Dez Bryant (1st team), Kendall Hunter (1st), Russell Okung (1st), Matt Fodge (2nd), Andre Sexton (2nd), Jacob Lacey (2nd)
Big 12 Special Teams Player of the Year: Dez Bryant

2008 team players in the NFL
The following players were drafted into professional football following the season.

The following Cowboys were signed as undrafted free agents: 
 Jacob Lacey was signed by the Indianapolis Colts.
 Ricky Price was signed by the Kansas City Chiefs.

References

Oklahoma State
Oklahoma State Cowboys football seasons
Oklahoma State Cowboys football